Angochitina is an extinct genus of chitinozoans. It was described by Alfred Eisenack in 1931.

Species 

 A. ambrosi Schweineberg, 1987
 A. capillata Eisenack, 1937
 A. ceratophora Eisenack, 1964
 A. communis Jenkins, 1967
 A. crassispina Eisenack, 1964
 A. curvata Nõlvak et Grahn, 1993
 A. echinata Eisenack, 1931
 A. elongata Eisenack, 1931
 A. filosa Eisenack, 1955
 A. hansonica Soufiane et Achab, 2000
 A. lebaica Eisenack, 1972
 A. longicollis Eisenack, 1959
 A. multiplex (Schallreuter, 1963)
 A. paucispinosa Miller, Sutherland et Dorning, 1997
 A. plicata

Fossil distribution 
Fossils of Angochitina have been found in:
Ordovician
 Pirgu & Vormsi Stages, Estonia

Silurian
 Wutubulake Formation, China
 Kopanina & Pozary Formations, Czech Republic
 Velise Formation, Estonia
 Robledo Formation, Spain
 Malinovtsy series, Ukraine

Devonian
 northwestern Argentina
 Garra Formation, Australia
 Lochkow Formation, Czech Republic
 Saint-Cenere & l'Armorique Formations, France

 Carboniferous
 Second Abden Shale, United Kingdom

References 

Prehistoric marine animals
Silurian animals of Asia
Silurian China
Fossils of China
Paleozoic animals of Europe
Fossils of the Czech Republic
Fossils of Estonia
Fossils of France
Fossils of Spain
Fossils of Ukraine
Paleozoic animals of Oceania
Fossils of Australia
Devonian animals of South America
Devonian Argentina
Fossils of Argentina
Fossil taxa described in 1931